Idylwood may refer to:

 Idylwood, Virginia, a town in Fairfax County, Virginia
 Idylwood, Houston, a neighborhood in Houston, Texas